Dinocephalus is a genus of longhorn beetles of the subfamily Lamiinae, containing the following species:

 Dinocephalus alboguttatus Breuning, 1958
 Dinocephalus haafi Breuning, 1961
 Dinocephalus heissi Holzschuh, 1991
 Dinocephalus ocellatus Aurivillius, 1908
 Dinocephalus ornatus Peringuey, 1899

References

Tragocephalini
Cerambycidae genera